Paul Harvey (born 10 November 1964) is an English professional boxer of the 1980s and '90s who won the Commonwealth super featherweight title and was a challenger for the World Boxing Board (WBB) featherweight title against Steve Robinson, and Wilson Docherty, his professional fighting weight varied from , i.e. featherweight to , i.e. lightweight. He was trained by his father, Lennox Harvey, who had moved to the country from Trinidad and worked as a local bus driver. Paul had a record of 16-1-5 over his 22 fights.

References

External links

1964 births
Living people
People from Islington (district)
English male boxers
Featherweight boxers
Lightweight boxers
Boxers from Greater London
Super-featherweight boxers